Jeże may refer to the following places:
Jeże, Łódź Voivodeship (central Poland)
Jeże, Lubusz Voivodeship (west Poland)
Jeże, Masovian Voivodeship (east-central Poland)
Jeże, Pomeranian Voivodeship (north Poland)
Jeże, Warmian-Masurian Voivodeship (north Poland)